Sinnadurai Vellupillai (born 13 April 1926) was a Singaporean field hockey player. He competed in the men's tournament at the 1956 Summer Olympics.

References

External links
 

1926 births
Possibly living people
Singaporean male field hockey players
Olympic field hockey players of Singapore
Field hockey players at the 1956 Summer Olympics
People from Selangor
Malaysian sportspeople of Indian descent
Malaysian people of Tamil descent
Malaysian emigrants to Singapore
Singaporean sportspeople of Indian descent
Singaporean people of Tamil descent
20th-century Singaporean people